Salon de l'Auto may refer to:
 The old name of the Mondial de l'Automobile (the Paris Motor Show, name changed in 1988)
 Salon International de l'Auto, the Geneva Motor Show
 Montreal International Auto Show or Le Salon International de l'auto de Montréal